The Île de Ré bridge connects La Rochelle to the Île de Ré, on the western coast of France. It was built by Bouygues and financed by the Charente-Maritime

It received a déclaration d'utilité publique in 1984, which allowed its construction, and was inaugurated on May 19, 1988.

Toll bridges in France
La Rochelle
Box girder bridges in France
Île de Ré